The men's slopestyle event in freestyle skiing at the 2014 Winter Olympics in Sochi, Russia took place 13 February 2014. In July 2011 freestyle slopestyle was added to the Olympic program, meaning the event would make its debut.

Qualification

An athlete must have placed in the top 30 at a World Cup event after July 2012 or at the 2013 World Championships and a minimum of 50 FIS points. A total of 30 quota spots were available to athletes to compete at the games. A maximum of 4 athletes could be entered by a National Olympic Committee.

However a total of 32 athletes are entered, meaning reallocations of quotas were done by the International Ski Federation.

Results

Qualification
The qualification was held at 10:15.

Final
The final was held at 13:30.

References

Men's freestyle skiing at the 2014 Winter Olympics